Liney is a surname. Notable people with the surname include:

John Liney (1912–1982), American cartoonist
Pat Liney (1936-2022), Scottish footballer

See also
Laney (surname)
Lindy (name)